The 2012 United States presidential election in Wisconsin took place on November 6, 2012, as part of the 2012 United States presidential election in which all 50 states plus the District of Columbia participated. Wisconsin voters chose 10 electors to represent them in the Electoral College via a popular vote pitting incumbent Democratic President Barack Obama and his running mate, Vice President Joe Biden, against Republican challenger and former Massachusetts Governor Mitt Romney and his running mate, Congressman Paul Ryan.

Obama won the state of Wisconsin with 52.83% of the vote to Romney's 45.89%, a 6.94% margin of victory. While this represented half the victory margin of Obama's  13.91% win in 2008, when he won 59 of 72 counties and 7 of 8 congressional districts, it was still a better performance than that of John Kerry's 0.38% margin in 2004 or Al Gore's 0.22% margin in 2000. Obama's win was also surprisingly comfortable in spite of the fact that Wisconsin was the home state of Republican Vice Presidential nominee Paul Ryan, making him the first Republican Vice Presidential nominee to lose their home state since Jack Kemp lost New York in 1996. Obama's win was attributed to victories in Milwaukee, the state's largest city; Madison, the state capital; northeastern Wisconsin; and the Driftless Region. Romney's strength was concentrated in the loyally Republican Milwaukee suburbs, particularly the WOW counties (Ozaukee, Washington, and Waukesha), where he carried a combined 67.03% of the vote to Obama's 32.00%. He also flipped 24 counties in the Northeast and Central Plain regions, though most of them were rural and therefore insufficient to overcome Obama's aforementioned victories. 

As of 2020, this is the last time the Democratic presidential nominee won the following counties: Adams, Buffalo, Columbia, Crawford, Dunn, Forest, Grant, Jackson, Juneau, Kenosha, Lafayette, Lincoln, Marquette, Pepin, Price, Racine, Richland, Sawyer, Trempealeau, Vernon, and Winnebago.  This is also the most recent cycle in which a Republican won Waukeusha county, a traditionally Republican stronghold in the state, with more than 65% of its votes.  This is also the last time a candidate of either party won Wisconsin with more than 50% of the vote as well as the last time Wisconsin voted more Democratic than the nation as a whole.

Primaries

Democratic primary

President Barack Obama ran unopposed in the Democratic Primary, winning 293,914 votes, or 97.89%. Uncommitted ballots received 5,092 votes, or 1.89% of the vote, while 849 votes, 0.28%, were scattered. 111 delegates, all of which were pledged to Obama were sent to the 2012 Democratic National Convention in Charlotte, North Carolina.

Republican primary

The 2012 Wisconsin Republican presidential primary took place on April 3, 2012, the same day as the primaries in the District of Columbia and Maryland. Mitt Romney edged out a victory, with 44.03% of the vote and 33 delegates, with former Senator Rick Santorum of Pennsylvania coming in second with 36.83% of the vote and 9 delegates. No other candidates won any delegates nor counties, though representative Ron Paul of Texas's 14th district received 11.15% and former Speaker of the House Newt Gingrich received 5.84%. All other candidates received less than 1%. Romney's strength was concentrated in Southeast Wisconsin, carrying Milwaukee and all of its suburbs (including the Kenosha and Racine as well as the ancestrally Republican counties of Ozaukee, Washington, and Waukesha), as well as Madison. Santorum's most significant victories were in Western Wisconsin and in Green Bay and its respective suburbs.

General election

Results
Although Republican Vice Presidential nominee Paul Ryan was from Wisconsin, representing the 1st district in Congress, the Republican Party lost by around a seven-point margin, which was, albeit an improved loss from Obama's landslide 13.91% margin in 2008, a crucial loss.

Results by county

Counties that flipped Democratic to Republican

 Barron (largest city: Rice Lake)
 Brown (largest city: Green Bay)
 Burnett (largest village: Grantsburg)
 Calumet (largest city: Chilton)
 Chippewa (largest city: Chippewa Falls)
 Clark (largest city: Neillsville)
 Iron (largest city: Hurley)
 Jefferson (largest city: Watertown)
 Kewaunee (largest city: Algoma)
 Langlade (largest city: Antigo)
 Manitowoc (largest city: Manitowoc)
 Marathon (largest city: Wausau)
 Marinette (largest city: Marinette)
 Monroe (largest city: Sparta)
 Oconto (largest city: Oconto)
 Oneida (largest city: Rhinelander)
 Outagamie (largest city: Appleton)
 Pierce (largest city: River Falls)
 Rusk (largest city: Ladysmith)
 Shawano (largest city: Shawano)
 Washburn (largest city: Spooner)
 Waupaca (largest city: New London)
 Waushara (largest city: Berlin)
 Wood (largest city: Marshfield)

By congressional districts
Despite losing the state, Romney won 5 of the 8 congressional districts.

See also
 United States presidential elections in Wisconsin
 2012 Republican Party presidential debates and forums
 2012 Republican Party presidential primaries
 Results of the 2012 Republican Party presidential primaries
 Wisconsin Republican Party

References

External links
The Green Papers: for Wisconsin
The Green Papers: Major state elections in chronological order

United States president
Wisconsin
2012